The 1949 North Carolina Tar Heels football team represented the University of North Carolina at Chapel Hill during the 1949 college football season. The Tar Heels were led by seventh-year head coach Carl Snavely and played their home games at Kenan Memorial Stadium. The team competed as members of the Southern Conference, winning the conference title with a perfect 5–0 conference record.

Halfback Charlie Justice was named an All-American and finished second in voting for the Heisman Trophy for the second consecutive year. He led the team in rushing, passing, and punting for the fourth consecutive year, with 377 rushing yards, 731 passing yards, and 2,777 punting yards. Art Weiner again joined him as an All-American end, being voted first-team by United Press, Sporting News, and INS. Kenny Powell was selected as a first-team defensive end All-American by NEA.

Schedule

References

North Carolina
North Carolina Tar Heels football seasons
Southern Conference football champion seasons
North Carolina Tar Heels football